The Forum is a historic event venue at 318-328 E. 43rd Street in the Bronzeville neighborhood of the Grand Boulevard community area of Chicago, Illinois. Chicago alderman William Kent and his father Albert had the venue built in 1897, intending it to be a social and political meeting hall. Architect Samuel Atwater Treat gave the building a Late Classical Revival design with Georgian Revival features. In its first decades, the Forum hosted speeches and rallies from politicians of all major parties and various community events.

Following the Great Migration of the 1920s, Bronzeville became a predominantly African-American neighborhood, but the Forum continued to serve as a community center. Several civil rights organizations met in the Forum, including the National Negro Congress' Chicago council; the Chicago Scottsboro Defense Conference, a group organized to defend the Scottsboro Boys; movements that petitioned to racially integrate Major League Baseball; and a meeting of the Freedom Riders. The Forum was also a major jazz venue, and Chicago musicians such as Nat King Cole and Tiny Parham played the venue often. In the 1940s, the building became the headquarters of the Improved Benevolent and Protective Order of Elks of the World, a black fraternal organization formed in response to the white-only Benevolent and Protective Order of Elks.

The building was added to the National Register of Historic Places on April 16, 2019.

References

Buildings and structures on the National Register of Historic Places in Chicago
Event venues on the National Register of Historic Places in Illinois
Music venues completed in 1897
Neoclassical architecture in Illinois
African-American history in Chicago